Manchester City is an English professional association football club based in Manchester, who currently play in the FA WSL. The list covers the period from 1988, when the club was founded, to the present day. It details the club's achievements in senior league and cup competitions, and the top scorers for each season where information is available.

Background
Manchester City were formed in 1988, though they did not join an organised competition until the following year when they were admitted to the North West Women's Regional Football League. The club would make steady progress upwards until the season, when they would take the Premier League Northern Division title and were promoted to the WPL National, then the highest level of semi-pro football attainable in England, and only below the closed shop FA WSL. City were admitted to the WSL in 2014, coinciding with their decision to turn professional, and the move would ultimately be rewarded with their first senior silverware the same season.

Seasons
Table correct as of 9 May 2021

Key

P = Played
W = Games won
D = Games drawn
L = Games lost
F = Goals for
A = Goals against
Pts = Points
Pos = Final position

Leagues
WSL = FA Women's Super League
WSL SS = FA WSL Spring Series
WPL Nt. = FA Women's Premier League National Division
WPL No. = FA Women's Premier League Northern Division
Comb = Northern Combination Women's Football League
NWWRFL Prem = North West Women's Regional Football League Premier Division
NWWRFL D1 = North West Women's Regional Football League Division One
NWWRFL D2 = North West Women's Regional Football League Division Two
Cups
WPL Cup = FA Women's Premier League Cup
PremDiv Cup = North West Women's Regional Football League Premier Division Cup
Div1 Cup = North West Women's Regional Football League Division One Cup
Div2 Cup = North West Women's Regional Football League Division Two Cup

QR = Qualifying round
PR = Preliminary round
R1 = Round 1
R2 = Round 2
R3 = Round 3
R4 = Round 4
R5 = Round 5
Ro16 = Round of 16
Ro32 = Round of 32
QF = Quarter-finals
SF = Semi-finals
RU = Runners-up
W = Winners

Footnotes
Despite being promoted, Manchester City fell from the second tier of women's football to the third tier due to the creation of a new national league (the FA Women's Premier League) with two tiers
The North West Women's Regional Football League Division One was renamed the Premier Division. It moved from being the third tier of women's football to the fourth tier due to the creation of the Northern Combination, an intermediate regional league between the NWWRFL and the Women's Premier League
The Women's Premier League Northern Division moved from being the second tier of women's football to the third tier due to the creation of the FA Women's Super League
Promoted to the WSL via means of application upon league expansion

External sources
MCWFC official site - Results page
RSSSF - Women's League Cup results
FA results - Women's National League

References

Seasons
 
Manchester City W.F.C.
Manchester City W.F.C.